On 10 November 2014 a suicide bomber dressed as student killed at least 46 and injured many people at school assembly at the Potiskum, north-eastern town of Nigeria which was carried out by Boko Haram.

References

2014 murders in Nigeria
Mass murder in 2014
Terrorist incidents in Nigeria in 2014
Suicide bombings in Nigeria